Nuestra Señora de la Purificación y la Candelaria (English: Our Lady of Purification and Candle)  is a venerated image of the Blessed Virgin Mary enshrined in Jaro Cathedral and the patroness of Western Visayas.

The devotion to Candelaria de Jaro derives from the original Virgin of Candelaria in Canarias, Spain and its feast day or Candlemas is celebrated every February 2. 

Pope John Paul II (now a papal saint) personally crowned the image on 20 February 1981. It is the first Marian image in Asia crowned by a pope and saint in person. Later, the image is declared as the patroness of Western Visayas via decree Quod Urbes on 1982.

Description
The title commemorates Mary's ritual purification during the Presentation of Jesus. Halakha (Jewish law) ordered that firstborn sons be redeemed at the Temple in Jerusalem when they were 40 days old. The mother, who expelled blood during the birth, was considered unclean for a week and 33 days thereafter, necessitating her purification at the same time the child is redeemed. Even though in Catholic doctrine, Mary herself was considered sinless ever since her Concepcion due to the merits of Christ. This, according to the theological treatises of Blessed Ramon Llull, the original author who wrote of the doctrine of "The Immaculate Concepcion". He was an ardent admirer as well as a staunch critic of Islamic thinkers: Al-Farabi, Avicenna and Ibn Sab'in. The Virgin Mary was pure and virginal: before, during and after Christ's birth, and has no need for "ritual purification" but due to her humility participated in the ritual anyway and by her humility showed the way for the purification of the whole of mankind.

Marian cult and veneration
The limestone statue discovered in the 16th-century was miraculously lifted up by fishermen who discovered its weight changed from something unable to be carried to one which was able to, when the Bishop declared that it should be placed on the Jaro church. It was also once found floating in the Iloilo River, something fascinating since stone statues don't usually float. It depicts Mary and the Child Jesus carrying tapers in their right hands a symbol of light and purification. It is customarily vested in gold cloth; crowns adorn mother and son, the latter holding a globus cruciger in his left hand symbolizing Christ's reign over the whole earth. The candle held by the cathedral's holy image is today tipped with a red electrical bulb.

History

Tradition recounts the statue's first appearance in 1587, when a group of fishermen found it floating in the Iloilo River. The fishermen initially could not lift the image due to its weight, but when they decided to bring it to Jaro, the image suddenly became easier to carry. The statue was initially placed in a small niche near the apex of the local church's central spire. Folklore speaks of the statue's growth in size over the centuries, to the point that it was transferred to the balcony. The image's shrine is accessible today by a flight of steps attached to the cathedral's northeastern façade.

The statue was declared patroness of the Western Visayas by Pope John Paul II who, in person, canonically crowned this image on 21 February 1981, during his first Apostolic Visit to the Philippines. It is thus the only Marian statue in the Philippines personally crowned by the Pontiff (and saint) instead of a proxy legate.

National Shrine

Pope Pius IX authorised the canonical erection of the Diocese of Jaro on 25 May 1865. Bishop Mariano Cuartero took possession of the diocese in 1868, and later partitioned it into nine dioceses. In 1874, Cuartero had the cathedral built on the site, dedicating it to Elizabeth of Hungary.

The original edifice was among the many structures destroyed in the Lady Caycay earthquake, an 8.2 surface wave magnitude tremor which struck Panay Island on 25 January 1948. Pope Pius XII elevated Jaro to an archdiocese on 29 June 1951 via a papal bull, and the cathedral was fully restored by 1956 under José María Cuenco, the first Archbishop of Jaro.

In January 2012, the Catholic Bishops' Conference of the Philippines approved "National Shrine of Our Lady of the Candles" as an additional title for the cathedral.

Confraternity
The Cofradia de la Nuestra Señora de la Candelaria is the shrine's lay confraternity recognized by the Archdiocese of Jaro.

See also
Roman Catholicism in the Philippines
Jaro Cathedral
Roman Catholic Archdiocese of Jaro
St. Vincent Ferrer Seminary

References

Shrines to the Virgin Mary
Catholic Church in the Philippines
Religion in Iloilo
Iloilo City
Titles of Mary
Statues of the Madonna and Child